Nikola Petković (born 23 February 2003) is a Serbian footballer who plays as a defensive midfielder for MLS Next Pro side Crown Legacy.

Career

At the age of 4, Petkovic began playing football before joining the Bambi Academy at the age of 7.

Petković began his career with Čukarički.

On 16 February 2023, he joined Crown Legacy FC, the reserve team for Major League Soccer side Charlotte FC, who compete in the MLS Next Pro.

International career

He has captained the Serbia national under-19 football team. 
Petković made his debut for Serbia national football team on 25 January 2023 in a friendly match against USA. Serbia won the game 2 – 1, with Petković being starter.

Career statistics

International

References

External links
 
 
 

2003 births
Living people
Association football midfielders
Serbian footballers
Serbian SuperLiga players
FK Čukarički players
People from Zrenjanin
Serbia international footballers
Serbian expatriate footballers
Serbian expatriate sportspeople in the United States
Expatriate soccer players in the United States